Duisburg-Wedau station is a railway station in the Wedau district in the city of Duisburg, located in North Rhine-Westphalia, Germany.

Rail services

References

Railway stations in North Rhine-Westphalia
Buildings and structures in Duisburg
Transport in Duisburg